Meriç Aral (born 17 November 1988) is a Turkish actress. After studying law, she started acting and became known with her role as Hale in Medcezir. She has taken part in various cinema and television productions.

Life and career 
Aral was born on 17 November 1988, to parents who were lawyers. She graduated from Istanbul Bilgi University School of Law, but also minored in comparative literature. She started acting after passing an internship. She worked as a film assistant for a short time. Aral made her television debut in the series Sultan and started to study acting. She rose to prominence with her role as Hale in Medcezir. Then he played in the movie Unutursam Fısılda, directed by Çağan Irmak. In the following period, she appeared in the series Yüksek Sosyete (2016) and in the movie Hesapta Aşk (2015) and Cingöz Recai: Bir Efsanenin Dönüşü (2017). She was then cast in a leading role in the TV series Söz alongside Tolga Sarıtaş, Deniz Baysal, Sarp Akkaya and Nihat Altınkaya between 2017 and 2019. In 2020, she played the character of Beril in the movie Biz Böyleyiz.

Filmography

References

External links 
 
 

1988 births
Istanbul Bilgi University alumni
Turkish television actresses
Living people
Turkish film actresses
Turkish podcasters
Turkish broadcasters
Women podcasters